Ruff-Ruff, Tweet and Dave is an interactive animated children's television series which premiered in the United Kingdom on CBeebies in 2015. Hulu acquired the streaming rights in 2016. Production ceased on new episodes when Universal Kids stopped developing original shows in 2019.

Synopsis
In each episode, Ruff-Ruff, Tweet and Dave are called out by Hatty the Hamster to go on adventures with him. A few times in each episode, Hatty will ask a question. The three title characters will give their answers, but only one of them is correct. Hatty then asks the viewers which of the three gave the correct answer to his question.

Characters

Main
 Hatty is a hamster and the show's host. He wears a bow-tie, and a top hat that shapeshifts from one episode to another. He takes the title characters to certain places in his top-shaped aircraft called the "Spin-Again". His shapeshifting hat also contains cards with questions that he reads to them. He would act like a school teacher to them by providing some information during their adventures. It is unknown if he has a house, although he has a garden where he occasionally takes his three friends to. Voiced by Forrest Harding (who in fact, sounds like a talking version of the Sprout character Chica, both voiced by the same person), later, Bryce Papenbrook in the United States and David Holt in the United Kingdom.
Ruff-Ruff is a red puppy, and one of the three title characters. He lives in a red house (resembling a ball with his ears) which sits beside Tweet's and Dave's house, and is located on a mountain that extends above a lake. He also drives a red Rolly Pod. He even likes to dig holes which, at times, result in finding lost items. Voiced by Ethan Drake Davis in the United States and Joseph West in the United Kingdom.
 Tweet is a yellow chick wearing pink glasses, and the shortest of the group. She lives in a yellow house that sits in between Ruff-Ruff's and Dave's. Her house resembles an egg, and drives a yellow Rolly Pod with a beak. She walks by moving her feet simultaneously instead of alternately. Voiced by Hannah Swain in the United States and Ella Pearl Marshall-Pinder in the United Kingdom.
 Dave is a blue panda, and is the largest of the title characters. He lives in a white house with blue ears that resembles him. His house is further on the right, being beside Tweet's house. He drives a big fat blue Rolly Pod. He is also the subject of Hatty's last question which the hamster asks at the end of each episode who will fall asleep first, and Dave is always the answer because he always falls asleep before Tweet & Ruff-Ruff. In one episode, Dave made a complete sweep by being the only one correct on every question Hatty asks. Voiced by Austin Nash Chase in the United States and Jonathan Millar in the United Kingdom. He likes bananas.

Other
 Mr. Squirrel is a orange squirrel whom Ruff-Ruff likes to chase around. He would sometimes aid the main characters in their adventures. As with characters other than the main ones, he does not speak.
 Cindy Squirrel is the other squirrel in the show.
 Speedy/Sneezy Sheep are a pair of sheep with a black stripe on the wools near their necks. They occasionally takes part in the main characters' games.
 Mrs. Duck is a green/brown duck who adores Tweet and swims around.
 The Cows are at the farm, but they do not speak.
 Farmer Fred is mentioned. 
 Bobby is a spider monkey who speaks a gibberish language.
 Tara is another monkey and is Bobby's sister.
 Littlest Rabbit is part of the Rabbit family the three title characters help sometimes. He is sometimes seen with his plush toy which is carrot with a face called a Cuddly Carrot.
 Mr. Rabbit is the father of the Rabbit family. He won a carrot contest of which Hatty was a contestant.

Episodes

Season 1 (2015-16)

 A Fairytale Adventure
 A Bouncy Adventure
 A Hide-and-Seek Adventure
 A Singing Adventure
 A Mountain Adventure
 A Beach Adventure
 A Pirate Adventure
 A Farmyard Adventure
 A Racing Adventure
 A Collecting Adventure
 A Gardening Adventure
 A Flying Adventure
 A Dancing Adventure
 A Kite Adventure
 A Cowboy Adventure
 A Birthday Party Adventure
 A Building Adventure
 A Puzzle Adventure
 A Counting Adventure
 An Opposite Adventure
 A Veggie Adventure
 A Happy Adventure
 A Rainbow Adventure
 An Exploring Adventure
 An Obstacle Adventure
 An Upside-Down Adventure
 A Traveling Adventure
 A Home Sweet Home Adventure
 A Train Adventure
 A Sailing Adventure
 A Remembering Adventure
 A Spot the Difference Adventure
 A Squeaky Ball Adventure
 A Mini Golf Adventure
 A Music-Making Adventure
 A Drawing Adventure
 An Apple Tree Adventure
 A Birdy Adventure
 An Inventing Adventure
 A Fix It Adventure
 A Driving Adventure
 A Signs Adventure
 A Pattern Adventure
 A Matching Adventure
 A Bubble Adventure
 A Starry Adventure
 A Movement Adventure
 A Playground Adventure
 A Superpower Adventure
 A Special Delivery Adventure
 A Happy Hat Adventure
 A Robot Adventure

Season 2 (2017-19)

 A Firefighter Adventure
 A Bibble Bink Adventure
 A Ruff-Ruff Adventure
 A Song Making Adventure
 A Game Show Adventure
 A Wishing Adventure
 A Noisy Adventure
 A Moving Home Adventure
 A Friends Adventure
 A Princess Adventure
 A Prize-Winning Adventure
 A Honey Adventure
 A Banana Adventure
 A Delivery Crew Adventure
 A Bug Adventure
 A Butterfly Adventure
 A Hiccup Adventure
 A Bunny-Sitting Adventure
 A Magic Show Adventure
 A Bowling Adventure
 A Cheerleading Adventure
 A Playhouse Adventure
 A Finding Adventure
 A Tall Adventure
 A Clean Up Adventure
 A Harvest Adventure
 An Animal Parade Adventure
 A Rollypod Adventure
 A Pairs Adventure
 A Show Adventure
 A Cake Adventure
 A Learning Adventure
 A Jungle Song Adventure
 A Be Safe Adventure
 A Photo Adventure
 A Story Finding Adventure
 A Pumpkin Adventure
 A Swapping Adventure
 A Super Tweet Adventure
 A Ring and Sing Adventure
 A Reporting Adventure
 A Fruit Juice Adventure
 A Finding the Way Adventure
 A Big Party Adventure
 A Hatty's Hat Adventure
 A Vacation Adventure
 A Hoe-Down Adventure
 A Jungle Games Adventure
 A Recycling Adventure
 An Egg Hunt Adventure
 A Police Adventure
 A Fly High Adventure

Special (2016)

 A Christmas Adventure

Notes

References

External links

2010s British animated television series
2010s British children's television series
2015 British television series debuts
2017 British television series endings
British children's animated adventure television series
British children's animated fantasy television series
British computer-animated television series
British preschool education television series
Animated preschool education television series
2010s preschool education television series
English-language television shows
Television series about chickens
Animated television series about dogs
CBeebies
Television series about pandas
Universal Kids original programming